Kimani 'Kim' Masai Herring (born September 10, 1975) is a former American football safety in the National Football League.

High school years
Herring attended Solon High School (Solon, Ohio) and was a letterman in football and track.

NFL career
A second round draft pick in the 1997 NFL draft, the 6'0", 212 lb. Herring played in 54 games for the Baltimore Ravens, including a victory and an interception in Super Bowl XXXV. After racking up 178 tackles, 2 sacks and 3 interceptions in his four seasons with Baltimore, he signed as a free agent with the St. Louis Rams in 2001. There he made another Super Bowl appearance that season in a 20-17 loss to the New England Patriots in Super Bowl XXXVI.

Herring started his first 32 games for the Rams until an injury forced him to spend the 2003 season on injured reserve. After signing with the Cincinnati Bengals in 2004, injuries continued to plague Herring. He played in 12 games for Cincinnati in 2004, but was sidelined for the entire 2005 season with a shoulder injury, and was released by the Bengals on March 31, 2006 in a salary cap move.

1975 births
Living people
Players of American football from Detroit
American football safeties
Baltimore Ravens players
Cincinnati Bengals players
St. Louis Rams players
Penn State Nittany Lions football players
People from Solon, Ohio
Players of American football from Ohio